Richard Watts Norden (4 January 1879 – 20 February 1952) was a South African cricketer who played first-class cricket for Transvaal from 1904 to 1907.

Norden was a left-arm spin bowler who played in the Transvaal teams that won the Currie Cup in 1903–04 and 1904–05. His outstanding match was the semi-final in 1904–05, when he took 4 for 21 and 8 for 12 (figures of 12–8–12–8) in Transvaal's innings victory over Rhodesia. After the match Norden was presented with the ball suitably mounted, a piece of memorabilia that now appears in the Gauteng Cricket Museum. The match was Rhodesia's first in the Currie Cup; they did not return to the competition until 1929–30.

References

External links
 

1879 births
1952 deaths
Cricketers from Transvaal Colony
Gauteng cricketers
Cricketers from Cape Town
Cape Colony people